Baix Penedès is a comarca in Catalonia, Spain. The area has been settled since the times of the Iberians, with ancient ruins remaining in Banyeres at Can Canyís, in the capital El Vendrell at the village of Guàrdies and in Calafell at the villages of Toixoneres and la Ciutadella ("The Citadel").

Municipalities

Castellers 
Baix Penedès has one of the longest-lived traditions of castellers in Catalonia. (Castellers practice the traditional Catalan art/sport of making human pyramids.) The comarcal capital, el Vendrell, has a monument dedicated to castellers.

The most important competitions of Castellers in the comarca occur each year as part of the August festival in honor of the Virgin Mary at Bisbal and on the fourth Sunday of August at L'Arboç, with castellers from all over Catalonia.

People from Baix Penedès 
Among the most important historical figures from Baix Penedès are:

Àngel Guimerà (1845–1924): writer. Guimerà was originally from the Canary Islands, but his mother was from el Vendrell, and he eventually settled there in his ancestral home, cal Guimerà.
Pablo Casals (1876–1973): cellist and composer. The house-museum vila Casals is at Sant Salvador, as is a concert hall, l'Auditori Pau Casals.
Aureli Maria Escarré (1908–1968): abbot of Montserrat. Since 1978, there has been a monument to him in his home village of l'Arboç, where his ancestral home is on the main street.
Andreu Nin (1892–1937) dissident Communist revolutionary in the Spanish Civil War)

References

External links 
Official comarcal web site (in Catalan)
Map, on the site of the Generalitat de Catalunya

 
Comarques of the Province of Tarragona